You Will Get Through This Night is a 2021 British non-fiction book by Daniel Howell written in conjunction with Dr. Heather Bolton. Described as a "practical mental health guide", it is Howell's first solo publication. It was published on 18 May 2021 by HarperCollins under the HQ and Dey Street Books imprints.

Contents
The book is split into three sections:

This Night – how to get through your toughest moments and be prepared to face anything.
Tomorrow – small steps to change your thoughts and actions with a big impact on your life.
The Days After – help to look after yourself in the long term and not just survive, but thrive.

Reception
An early editorial review on Library Journal compared the book favourably to The Midnight Library by Matt Haig and described it as a "narrative about finding hope and healing". Glamour UK posted an extract about dealing with setbacks, calling it "essential reading" during an increase in depression and other mental health issues among adults. It became a #1 Sunday Times Bestseller.

References

2021 non-fiction books
Books about mental health
Books by YouTubers
English non-fiction books
Self-help books
HarperCollins books